Brandywine Springs is a historic area near Newport, Delaware, along the Red Clay Creek.

It is noted from early American history as a Revolutionary War encampment of General George Washington's army.

In 1853, Captain Alden Partridge opened the National Scientific and Military Academy at Brandywine Springs. The school building was destroyed by fire shortly after opening and the school closed.

In the 1880s, it became known for its mineral springs and luxurious hotel resort

In the early 20th century, it became renowned for an amusement park built along the Hyde Run tributary. The amusement park closed down following the 1923 season. The Friends of Brandywine Springs are dedicated to recovering the history of the amusement park. Early films of the park from circa 1903 are some of the earliest motion picture images of Delaware. 

In 1956 state senator Fredrick Klair procured the land for the state and established Brandywine Springs State Park. In 1970, Brandywine Springs was converted from a state park to a county park operated by New Castle County as the legislature felt it better met local needs as opposed to state needs, and there had been no county-level parks department at the time it was created as a state park.

References

External links

Bodies of water in New Castle County, Delaware
Springs of Delaware
Defunct amusement parks in the United States
Historic districts in New Castle County, Delaware
Parks in New Castle County, Delaware
Geography of New Castle County, Delaware